is a Japanese voice actress from Osaka Prefecture, Japan. On February 2, 2014, she married fellow voice actor and her Mahoromatic co-star Hideki Ogihara.

Filmography

Anime
Mahoujin Guru Guru (1994) (Nike)
Captain Tsubasa J (1994) (Sanae Nakazawa)
Kiko-chan Smile (1996) (Masacado)
Hoshi no Kirby (2001) (Tokkori)
Inazuma Eleven: Ares no Tenbin (2018 series) (2018) (Fūsuke Suzuno)

Unknown date 

Bakuto Sengen Daigunder (Akira Akebono)
B'TX (Gaku)
Buzzer Beater (Hideyoshi)
Bonobono (Chibisuke to Okera-kun)
Crayon Shin-chan (Nurse)
Detective Conan (Makoto Kyogoku (young))
Gravitation (Suguru Fujisaki)
Go! Go! Itsutsugo Land (Kabuto Morino)
Hell Teacher Nūbē (Meisuke Nueno (young))
Higurashi When They Cry (Suguru Okamura)
Kujibiki Unbalance (2006 series) (Chihiro Enomoto)
Inazuma Eleven (Rika Urabe, Fūsuke Suzuno/Gazel, Kimiyuki Nemuro/Nero)
Lovely Complex (Seishirō "Seiko" Kotobuki)
Mahoromatic (Suguru Misato)
Mama Loves the Poyopoyo-Saurus (Yū Kunitachi)
Rockman EXE (Kojirō Aragaki)
Naruto Shippuden (young Asuma)
Nintama Rantaro (Sakon Kawanishi)
Noein (Yū Gotō)
Pocket Monsters (young Mewtwo)
Raideen the Superior (Hayate Ohtori)
This Ugly Yet Beautiful World (Ryo Ninomiya)
Those Who Hunt Elves (Branko)
Tsubasa: Reservoir Chronicle (Masayoshi Saitō)
YAT Anshin! Uchū Ryokō (Edward)

Movies
Naruto Shippuden the Movie: The Lost Tower (2010) (Sarai, young Asuma)

Video games
Flash Hiders (Erue)
Magical Circle Guru Guru (Nike)
Soul Edge (Taki)
Klonoa: Door to Phantomile (Huepow)
Grandia (Justin)
Clock Tower: Ghost Head (Shou)
Soulcalibur (Taki)
The Legend of Zelda: Ocarina of Time (Young Link)
The Legend of Zelda: Majora's Mask (Young Link)
Power Stone 2 (Julia)
Super Smash Bros. Melee (Young Link)
Soulcalibur II (Taki)
GioGio's Bizarre Adventure (Narancia Ghirga)
Namco × Capcom (Taki, Tarosuke)
Soulcalibur III (Taki)
Kujibiki Unbalance: Kaichō Onegai Smash Fight (Chihiro Enomoto)
Hyrule Warriors (Young Link)
Super Smash Bros. Ultimate (Young Link)

Unknown date
Ape Escape series (Kakeru)

Dubbing roles

Live action
Annie: A Royal Adventure!, Michael Webb (George Wood)
Double Jeopardy, Matty Parsons (Benjamin Weir)
Funny Games, Georgie Farber (Devon Gearhart)
School of Rock, Zack "Zack-Attack" Mooneyham (Joey Gaydos Jr.)
Spy Kids (Netflix/Hulu edition), Juni Cortez (Daryl Sabara)
The Time Machine (2002), Kalen (Omero Mumba)
Tropic Thunder, Tran (Brandon Soo Hoo)
Willy Wonka & The Chocolate Factory, Charlie Bucket (Peter Ostrum)

Animation
King of the Hill, Bobby Hill (Pamela Adlon)

References

External links
Official agency profile 

Living people
Arts Vision voice actors
Japanese video game actresses
Japanese voice actresses
Voice actresses from Osaka Prefecture
20th-century Japanese actresses
21st-century Japanese actresses
Year of birth missing (living people)